Dmitri Baltermants (13 May 1912 – 11 June 1990) was a prominent Soviet photojournalist.

Early life
Baltermants was born on 13 May 1912 in Warsaw, then in Congress Poland, Russian Empire. His father served in the Imperial Russian Army and was killed in the First World War.

Baltermants graduated from the Moscow State University.

Career
Baltermants planned to become a math teacher in a Military Academy, but he fell in love with photography and began a career in the field of photojournalism in 1939. He was an official Kremlin photographer, worked for the daily Izvestia and was picture editor of the popular magazine Ogonyok.

During World War II, Baltermants covered the battle of Stalingrad, and the battles of the Red Army in Russia and Ukraine. He was twice wounded.

Just like his fellow photographers covering the Red Army during the war, Baltermants' images were always censored by Soviet authorities in order to select only the ones that reflected on the positive sides of service in order to help boost morale. Some of his most captivating photos were suppressed, and became public much later, in the 1960s. His work gained attention in the West where it was distributed by the Sovfoto agency.

One of the more famous images, called "Grief", depicts a 1942 Nazi massacre of Jews in the Crimean city of Kerch. It shows the grief of village women as they search for the bodies of their loved ones. A powerful oversaturated sky above, burnt in during the printing of the photo, makes the image even more dramatic. This Image was used on the cover of the Dir En Grey album, The Marrow of a Bone.

Death
Baltermants died on June 11, 1990.

Exhibitions
2004, Dmitri Baltermants. Images of The Soviet Union, Hatton Gallery, Colorado State University, Fort Collins, USA
2005, Dmitry Baltermants, Multimedia Art Museum, Moscow
2012, Retrospective, Multimedia Art Museum, Moscow

Representative Works

At Utah Museum of Fine Arts

Soviet athletes at the International Peace Festival	2003	photograph	Currently not on exhibition	UMFA2014.20.28

Inside the canning factory	no date printed 2003, 1912-1990	gelatin silver print	Currently not on exhibition  UMFA2010.20.15

Two women gossiping, Cuba	21st Century	photograph	Currently not on exhibition	UMFA2013.11.7

Pacific fisherman with his nets	1960s, 2003	gelatin silver print	Currently not on exhibition	UMFA2012.12.24

Building the Komsomolskaya Blast Furnace, Zhdanov City	no date printed 2003, 1912-1990	gelatin silver print	Currently not on exhibition	UMFA2010.20.19

Bomber commander V. Kovalik and his men	2003	photograph	Currently not on exhibition	UMFA2014.20.18

Agricultural workers	no date printed 2003, 1912-1990	gelatin silver print	Currently not on exhibition	UMFA2010.20.18

Khruschchev inaugurates a statute, early 1960s	1962 printed 2003, 1912-1990	gelatin silver print	Currently not on exhibition	UMFA2010.20.35

Khrushchev seated with the Communist Party Central Committee, including Mikoyan, Brezhnev, Suslov, Gromyko and Furtseva (diptych, part two)	2003	photograph	Currently not on exhibition	UMFA2014.20.30B

References

External links
Baltermants's famous photo "Grief"
Other photographs taken by Dmitri Baltermants
More photographs taken by Dmitri Baltermants
Collection: "Dmirtri Baltermants Photographs from WWII" from the University of Michigan Museum of Art

1912 births
1990 deaths
War photographers
Soviet photographers
Moscow State University alumni
Writers from Warsaw